Michael Spellman (born November 19, 1978) is an American film, television and stage actor. He appeared in the movie Charlie Wilson's War and on the TV shows How I Met Your Mother, ER and Lie to Me.

References

External links

Michael Spellman - Official website

1978 births
American male film actors
American male stage actors
American male television actors
Living people
Male actors from Detroit
20th-century American male actors